Spanish Synagogue may refer to:
 Spanish Synagogue (Prague)
 Spanish Synagogue (Venice)